The MLS Save of the Year Award is awarded by Major League Soccer to a player who is voted by fans as having the best save of the MLS season.

Winners

References 

SAVE
Association football goalkeeper awards
Association football player non-biographical articles